Sir John Eardley Eardley-Wilmot, 1st Baronet  (21 February 1783 – 3 February 1847) was a politician in the United Kingdom who served as Member of Parliament (MP) for North Warwickshire and then as Lieutenant-Governor of Van Diemen's Land (later called Tasmania).

Eardley-Wilmot was the son of John Eardley Wilmot (1748–1815), barrister, and grandson of Sir John Eardley Wilmot, Chief Justice of the Common Pleas. He was educated at Harrow School, called to the bar in 1806, appointed High Sheriff of Warwickshire in 1818 or 1819 and created a baronet in 1821 and in 1822 published An Abridgment of Blackstone's Commentaries. This was followed in 1827 by A Letter to the Magistrates of England on the Increase of Crime, by Sir Eardley Eardley-Wilmot, Bart. F.R.S., F.L.S. and F.S.A. He was a member of the House of Commons, representing North Warwickshire from 1832 until March 1843. In 1840 he attended an international meeting on 12 June 1840 on anti-slavery. A large painting in the National Portrait Gallery records that event and Eardley-Wilmot is shown with Dr Stephen Lushington, a judge, behind the main speaker.

Eardley-Wilmot was appointed lieutenant-governor of Van Diemen's Land, and arrived at Hobart on 17 August. He probably owed his position to the interest he had taken in the subject of crime; his plea that prisoners under the age of 21 should be segregated and a special endeavour made to reform them suggests that he was in advance of his period.

Soon after his arrival he came into conflict with one of the judges by reprieving a prisoner sentenced to be hanged. His justification was that he would not inflict death for offences not on the records of the court, and that in this case only robbery had been proved. He visited various parts of the island and seemed likely to be a popular governor. Many prisoners were arriving, expenses were rising, and the governor was much hampered by instructions received from the colonial office. In 1844 Eardley-Wilmot suggested that the 1842 Act (setting a £1 per acre minimum land price) should not apply in Van Diemen's Land – to which the British government agreed in 1845. He endeavoured to raise the duties on sugar, tea and other foreign goods, but the opposition from the colonists was great and the new taxes were withdrawn. The colonial office was unable to understand that convict labour could not be made to pay its way, and Wilmot was made responsible for the faults of a system he had no power to amend. He endeavoured to save expenses by reducing salaries of officials, but the chief justice for one denied the power of the council to reduce his salary. Six members of the council objected to the form of the estimates and withdrew from the council which reduced the number present below a quorum, and much public feeling arose against the governor.

In April 1846 Wilmot was recalled. The official statements relating to his recall were of the vaguest character, such as that he had not shown "an active care of the moral interests involved in the system of convict discipline". Privately Gladstone, the new colonial secretary, informed Wilmot that he was not recalled for any errors in his official character, but because rumours reflecting on his moral character had reached the colonial office. There was no truth in these charges nor was there time for Wilmot to receive any reply to his indignant denials, and requests for the names of his accusers. He died on 3 February 1847, worn-out by worry and anxiety.  Gladstone endeavoured to make some amends in a letter to one of Wilmot's sons.

Wilmot married (1) Elizabeth Emma, daughter of Caleb Hillier Parry in 1808 and (2) Elizabeth, daughter of Sir Robert Chester in 1819.  There were sons and daughters of both marriages, including John's successor John and the clergyman Edward Revell Eardley-Wilmot.  There is a monument in memory of Wilmot at Hobart, erected by public subscription.

Wilmot features as a main character in T.S.Flynn's historical novel "Part an Irishman: The Regiment".

Memorials
The locality of Wilmot in Tasmania was named for him.

References

Michael Roe, 'Eardley-Wilmot, Sir John Eardley (1783–1847)', Australian Dictionary of Biography, Vol. 1, Melbourne University Press, 1966, pp 345–346

Further reading
 
 Robson, L. L. (1983). A History of Tasmania. Volume I. Van Diemen's Land From the Earliest Times to 1855. Melbourne: Oxford University Press. .
 T.S. Flynn (2016) Part an Irishman,

External links 
 

1783 births
1847 deaths
High Sheriffs of Warwickshire
Baronets in the Baronetage of the United Kingdom
Members of the Parliament of the United Kingdom for English constituencies
Governors of Tasmania
UK MPs 1832–1835
UK MPs 1835–1837
UK MPs 1837–1841
UK MPs 1841–1847
Australian penal colony administrators
Fellows of the Royal Society
Van Diemen's Land people
Sheriffs of Warwickshire
John
19th-century Australian public servants
People educated at Harrow School